K14RB-D is a digital low-power television station operated by St. Michael Broadcasting, Inc. in Minneapolis, Minnesota, broadcasting locally on digital UHF channel 14 atop the IDS Center in downtown Minneapolis. It broadcasts from the IDS Center with a 15 kW signal that carried it to the suburbs, such as Elk River, Minnesota and White Bear Lake, Minnesota. The channel broadcasts original programming on channel 14.3; the EWTN network on channels 14.2, 14.4, and 14.5; and text-based Catholic and local news, events, and information (including subchannel schedules) on 14.1.

Due to the digital repack, the station signed off temporarily in May 2018, when KPXM moved transmitters from Big Lake to a tower shared with radio station KQQL, near the town of Nowthen, Minnesota, along with moving to channel 16 (full-power stations are allowed to change channel positions and force low-power stations to find a new acceptable allocation). KPXM remapped to 41.1, mirroring the setup at Big Lake.

St. Michael Broadcasting resumed broadcasting on digital UHF channel 14, with the new call letters K14RB-D, on July 9, 2018.

Digital channels
The station's signal is multiplexed:

References

External links
 www.smbtv.org - Official website

Low-power television stations in the United States
Television stations in Minneapolis–Saint Paul
Television channels and stations established in 1989
1989 establishments in Minnesota